Melinda and Melinda is a 2004 American comedy film written and directed by Woody Allen. It premiered at the San Sebastian International Film Festival. The film is set in Manhattan and stars Radha Mitchell as the protagonist Melinda, in two storylines; one comic, one tragic. The film began a limited release in the United States on March 18, 2005.

Synopsis
The premise of the film is stated by a group of four writers conversing over dinner at the beginning of the film. The question arises: Is life naturally comic or tragic? One of the four proposes a simple story (a distraught woman knocks on a door and disrupts a dinner party) and the two prominent playwrights in the group begin telling their versions of this story, one being comic and one tragic.

Cast

Radha Mitchell as Melinda Robicheaux
Chloë Sevigny as Laurel
Jonny Lee Miller as Lee
Will Ferrell as Hobie
Amanda Peet as Susan
Chiwetel Ejiofor as Ellis Moonsong
Wallace Shawn as Sy, the comedian
Josh Brolin as Greg Earlinger
Vinessa Shaw as Stacey Fox
Steve Carell as Walt
Arija Bareikis as Sally Oliver
Matt Servitto as Jack Oliver
Zak Orth as Peter
Brooke Smith as Cassie
Daniel Sunjata as Billy Wheeler
Larry Pine as Max, the tragedian
Andy Borowitz as Doug

Radha Mitchell plays Melinda in both versions. Chloë Sevigny, Jonny Lee Miller, and Chiwetel Ejiofor star with her in the tragedy, while Will Ferrell and Amanda Peet star with her in the comedy. Steve Carell has a small part as Ferrell's character's friend.

Production
Woody Allen said in Conversations with Woody Allen that he wanted to cast Winona Ryder in the title role.  He had to replace her with Radha Mitchell because no one would insure Ryder due to her arrest for shoplifting – this would have made it impossible to obtain a film completion bond. Allen stated he was sad because he had written the part for Ryder after working with her on Celebrity. In the same interview, he also claimed to have intended Ferrell's part for Robert Downey, Jr., but, again, insurance got in the way due to Downey's history of arrests and drug abuse.

The film also stars Wallace Shawn (alluding to his dinner-philosophy argument in My Dinner with Andre) as the comic playwright, Larry Pine as the tragedian, and Brooke Smith as Cassie. All three had appeared in the 1994 film Vanya on 42nd Street, directed by Louis Malle.

Critical reception
The film received mixed reviews from critics. Review aggregator Rotten Tomatoes lists a 51% positive score, based on 144 reviews. Metacritic reported the film had an average score of 54 out of 100, based on 40 reviews. Leonard Maltin gave the film two stars, calling it "meandering,” with "echoes... of earlier, better Allen movies".

Box office
Melinda and Melinda opened on March 18, 2005, in one New York City cinema, where it grossed $74,238 in its first three days, the 21st highest limited release opening in American history. In weekend two, it expanded to 95 theatres to gross $740,618, seeing its per screen average drop to $7,795.

Overseas, it grossed an additional $16,259,545, bringing its worldwide total to $20,085,825.

Soundtrack

Accompanying the movie is its soundtrack, released on March 8, 2005 on Milan Records. It mostly features a selection of swing music and big band tracks, which is typical for Allen's films.

Track listing

References

External links

Woody Allen interview for Melinda And Melinda

2004 films
2004 comedy-drama films
Films directed by Woody Allen
Films set in Manhattan
Films with screenplays by Woody Allen
Films produced by Letty Aronson
Fox Searchlight Pictures films
Films shot in New York City
2004 comedy films
2004 drama films
2000s English-language films
American comedy-drama films